Channel hopping can refer to:

Channel surfing, switching between television channels
Frequency-hopping spread spectrum, in telecommunications, sending radio signals using different carrier frequencies
Booze cruise, a brief trip across the English Channel from Britain in order to buy cigarettes or alcohol